Larry Dumelie was a defensive back for the Saskatchewan Roughriders of the Canadian Football League from 1960 to 1967. He was a member of their Grey-Cup winning team of 1966.

Larry Dumelie played college football at the University of Arizona for 3 years.  Dumelie joined the Saskatchewan Roughriders in 1960 and played with them during his entire CFL career lasting 8 years, mostly as a defensive back. Playing between 11 and 16 games throughout his career, he intercepted 13 balls, 6 in 1964. He also served as a punt and kick returner, averaging 4.9 and 22.0 yards respectively, but never scored a touchdown . He was a member of the Roughriders' first Grey-Cup winning team of 1966.

References

Canadian football defensive backs
Saskatchewan Roughriders players
Players of Canadian football from Saskatchewan
1930s births
Living people
People from Lafleche, Saskatchewan
Canadian players of American football
Arizona Wildcats football players